This article is about the list of CD Travadores players.  Clube Desportivo Travadores is a Cape Verdean football (soccer) club based in Praia, Cape Verde and plays at Estádio da Várzea.  The club was formed on 15 October 1929.

List of players

Notes

References

External links
List of CD Travadores players at the official Travadores Facebook website 

CD Travadores
Travadores
Association football player non-biographical articles